Saribia tepahi is a butterfly in the family Riodinidae. It is found on Tamatave, Madagascar. The habitat consists of forests.

References

Butterflies described in 1833
Nemeobiinae